is a former Japanese football player.

Playing career
Sugimoto was born in Kanagawa Prefecture on June 4, 1982. He joined J2 League club Shonan Bellmare based in his local from youth team in 2000. He played several matches as defender every season from first season. However he could not play many matches and he could not play at all in the match in 2003. He retired end of 2003 season.

Club statistics

External links

1982 births
Living people
Association football people from Kanagawa Prefecture
Japanese footballers
J2 League players
Shonan Bellmare players
Association football midfielders